Acrolophus cervicolor is a moth of the family Acrolophidae. It is found in Argentina.

References

cervicolor
Moths described in 1931
Taxa named by Edward Meyrick